Mocquerysiella bourginella is a moth in the family Depressariidae. It was described by Pierre Viette in 1954. It is found in Madagascar.

References

Moths described in 1954
Stenomatinae